Rosemount is a historic plantation house near Forkland, Alabama.  The Greek Revival style house was built in stages between 1832 and the 1850s by the Glover family. The house has been called the "Grand Mansion of Alabama." The property was added to the National Register of Historic Places on May 27, 1971. The Glover family enslaved over 300 people from 1830 until 1860.

History
Allen Glover, of Demopolis, gave the  property to his son, Williamson Allen Glover, in the early 1830s. The main block of the house, designed in 1832 by state architect, William Nichols, is centered on a prominent star-shaped hill.  This main block, with three floors and a mezzanine, was built in 1835.  Williamson Allen Glover continued to expand the rear and interior of the house, through successive additions and reconfigurations, up to 1855.  He went on to raise a total of sixteen children in the mansion's twenty rooms.

Architecture
The exterior of the house features a Carolina-type monumental two-story Ionic portico, east and west side porches, and a continuous cornice with dentils above the second story and the cupola. The house plan forms a T-shape, to take advantage of the cross-ventilation that this plan affords. The cupola functioned as a look-out over the plantation and, along with the great halls, as a way to exhaust heated air out of the house during hot weather. Though no longer extant, the grounds once included formal gardens, a carriage house, a two-story servant's quarters, a schoolhouse, several barns, a corn crib, a shop, five slave cabins behind the main house, and a "slave village" about one mile away. Additionally there was a detached kitchen, now destroyed, that was later moved and attached to the house.

The house passed through different families over the years, going through some periods of disrepair and later, restorations. A massive restoration was begun around 2005 and the exterior was completely finished.

See also
Glover Mausoleum, built for Williamson Glover's father and also listed on the NRHP

References

 https://sankofagenus.com/2017/06/24/rosemount-plantation/

National Register of Historic Places in Greene County, Alabama
Houses on the National Register of Historic Places in Alabama
Houses completed in 1850
Greek Revival houses in Alabama
Plantation houses in Alabama
Houses in Greene County, Alabama
Slave cabins and quarters in the United States